Donna Andrea Joseph (née Carvalhal, born 6 July 1981), known as Donna Carvalhal, is a Canadian-born Guyanese retired footballer who played as a defender. She has been a member of the Guyana women's national team.

College career
Carvalhal attended Western University for her first year of university. She attended LIU Brooklyn for her second year, then completed the rest of her undergraduate degree at the University of Toronto. Finally, she attended Seneca College for post-graduate studies.

International career
Carvalhal capped for Guyana at senior level during the 2010 CONCACAF Women's World Cup Qualifying (and its qualification).

See also
List of Guyana women's international footballers

References

1981 births
Living people
Citizens of Guyana through descent
Guyanese women's footballers
Women's association football defenders
Guyana women's international footballers
Canadian women's soccer players
Seneca College alumni
Canadian sportspeople of Guyanese descent